The 2000 KNVB Cup Final was a football match between NEC and Roda JC on 21 May 2000 at De Kuip, Rotterdam. It was the final match of the 1999–2000 KNVB Cup competition. Roda JC won 2–0 after goals from Bob Peeters and Eric van der Luer. It was their second KNVB Cup win.

Route to the final

Match

Details

References

2000
1999–2000 in Dutch football
Roda JC Kerkrade matches
May 2000 sports events in Europe
NEC Nijmegen